Zhang Guirong (born 5 February 1978) is a Chinese-born Singaporean shot putter. She changed nationality from China in late 2003.

Her personal best throw is 18.57 metres, achieved at the 2005 Asian Championships in Incheon. This is the current Singaporean record. She is also the national record holder in discus throw and javelin throw.

Achievements

References

External links
 

1978 births
Living people
People from Shandong
Chinese emigrants to Singapore
Singaporean sportspeople of Chinese descent
Naturalised citizens of Singapore
Chinese female shot putters
Singaporean shot putters
Chinese female athletes
Singaporean female athletes
Athletes (track and field) at the 2004 Summer Olympics
Athletes (track and field) at the 2008 Summer Olympics
Olympic athletes of Singapore
Athletes (track and field) at the 2006 Commonwealth Games
Commonwealth Games competitors for Singapore
Athletes (track and field) at the 2010 Asian Games
Southeast Asian Games medalists in athletics
Southeast Asian Games gold medalists for Singapore
Southeast Asian Games silver medalists for Singapore
Southeast Asian Games bronze medalists for Singapore
Competitors at the 2003 Southeast Asian Games
Competitors at the 2005 Southeast Asian Games
Competitors at the 2007 Southeast Asian Games
Competitors at the 2009 Southeast Asian Games
Competitors at the 2011 Southeast Asian Games
Asian Games competitors for China
21st-century Chinese women